Karlštejn (1916) is an opera by Czech composer Vítězslav Novák, a pupil of Dvořák. It was the composer's second opera and written with nationalist intentions during World War I. The plot is based on Jaroslav Vrchlický's drama of the same name. It was moderately successful and performed over 70 times in Prague.

Cast

Recordings
 Aria of Charles IV: Je-li nutno, pane vévodo - Svatý Václave. Sung by Ivan Kusnjer, cond. Libor Pešek. LP Panton 1984, reissued on CD Supraphon 2011.

References

Compositions by Vítězslav Novák
Czech-language operas
1916 operas
Operas based on plays
Operas